For the American author of young adult fiction, see Stacey Lee.

Stacey Lee is a documentary film director from New Zealand.

Biography 
Lee began her career in advertising, working for Saatchi & Saatchi in New Zealand from 2002 to 2007, then for advertising agencies 180 Amsterdam and Mother New York. In 2006, she was ranked 9th equal in the world at the YoungGuns International Awards. While working with athletes in Amsterdam for an Adidas campaign, she moved into film-making. Her films have appeared at the 2015 Tribeca Film Festival and the 2020 Toronto International Film Festival.

Filmography

References

External links
 

New Zealand film directors
Living people
Year of birth missing (living people)